Andrea Marina Pérez Peña (born April 7, 1990) is an Ecuadorian sport shooter. She placed 37th in the women's 25 metre pistol event at the 2016 Summer Olympics. She competed at the 2020 Summer Olympics.

References

1990 births
Living people
ISSF pistol shooters
Ecuadorian female sport shooters
Olympic shooters of Ecuador
Shooters at the 2016 Summer Olympics
Pan American Games medalists in shooting
Pan American Games silver medalists for Ecuador
Pan American Games bronze medalists for Ecuador
Shooters at the 2019 Pan American Games
Medalists at the 2019 Pan American Games
Shooters at the 2020 Summer Olympics
Sportspeople from Guayaquil
21st-century Ecuadorian women